Parapsycharium is a genus of moths in the family Somabrachyidae containing only one species Parapsycharium paarlense, which is known from South Africa.

References

Endemic moths of South Africa
Zygaenoidea
Moths of Africa
Zygaenoidea genera
Monotypic moth genera